Conal Holmes O'Connell O'Riordan (pseudonym Norreys Connell) (29 April 1874 – 18 June 1948) was an Irish dramatist and novelist.

Career

Works

Novels
His novels include:
In the Green Park or The Half-Pay Deities (1894) 
The House of the Strange Woman (1895)
The Fool and His Heart (1896) 
The Pity of War (1906)  
Adam of Dublin (1920)
Adam and Caroline (1921) 
In London: The Story of Adam and Marriage (1922)
Rowena Barnes (1923)
Married Life (1924)
The Age of Miracles (1925)
Young Lady Drazincourt (1925)   
Soldier Born (1927)
Soldier of Waterloo (1928)
Soldier’s Wife (1935) 
Soldier's End (1938)
Judith Quinn, a Novel for Women (1939) 
Judith’s Love (1940)

Play
His plays include:
Rope Enough (1913)
His Majesty's Pleasure (1925)
Napoleon’s Josephine (1928)
The King's Wooing (1929)

References

External links
 http://www.ricorso.net/rx/az-data/authors/o/ORiordan_C/life.htm

20th-century Irish dramatists and playwrights
Irish male dramatists and playwrights
19th-century Irish novelists
1874 births
1948 deaths
Writers from Dublin (city)
People educated at Clongowes Wood College
People educated at Belvedere College
Irish male novelists
20th-century Irish novelists
19th-century Irish male writers
20th-century Irish male writers